Atiqur Rahman Fahad is a Bangladeshi footballer who plays as a midfielder for Bashundhara Kings.

International career

Olympic team
Fahad has represented Bangladesh by playing for the Bangladesh U23 team. On September 15, 2014, he played in the 2014 Asian Games against Afghanistan U 23 which was his debut for the Bangladesh U23 team .He participated in the 2014 Asian Games for the Bangladesh U-23 team, but the team was not able to get past the group stage; He played only once in that competition. He also participated in the 2018 Asian Games 16-team event for the Bangladesh U23 team in 2016. He has played in 5 matches for the age group of Bangladesh in almost 2 years.

Bangladesh national team
On March 17, 2016, at the age of just 20 years, 6 months and 4 days, Fahad, a right footed player, competed in a friendly match against the UAE which was his debut for Bangladesh. He entered the field as a substitute in that match; He played in the match as a midfielder. The match was lost by Bangladesh 6–1. In his debut year for Bangladesh, Fahad played in only one match.

References

Living people
1995 births
Bangladeshi footballers
Bangladesh international footballers
Bangladesh youth international footballers
Association football midfielders
Footballers at the 2014 Asian Games
Asian Games competitors for Bangladesh
Bashundhara Kings players